Teenage Lust may refer to:
Teen Age Lust (album), an album by MC5
"Teenage Lust", a song on that album and their 1970 album Back in the USA
Teen Lust (1979 film), a film directed by James Hong
Teen Lust (2014 film), a Canadian film directed by Blaine Thurier
Teenage Lust, a 1970s New York based glam rock band
"Teenage Lust", a song by Jesus and Mary Chain from their 1992 album Honey's Dead
Teenage Lust, a book by Larry Clark